Hungry Lions F.C. are a South African football club based in the small Northern Cape town of Postmasburg.

They currently play in the National First Division, earning promotion after winning the 2020–21 SAFA Second Division.

History
Hungry Lions was founded in the 1980s by Stefaans Basie‚ who is still the owner and chairman. After initially playing friendlies and once-off tournaments, they entered competitive leagues in 2000, working themselves up from local leagues, then the SAB League, until around 2004 they were promoted to the SAFA Second Division.

Honours
 SAFA Second Division: 2020–21
 SAFA Second Division, Northern Cape Stream A/South Stream: 2017–18, 2018–19, 2020–21

References

External links

Soccer clubs in South Africa
Association football clubs established in the 1980s
National First Division clubs
1980s establishments in South Africa